The TransJakarta Corridor 2 is the TransJakarta bus rapid transit route that serves from the Pulo Gadung Bus Terminal to the Harmoni Central Busway (HCB) BRT Station. The roads that corridor 2 passes are along Jalan Perintis Kemerdekaan, Letjen Suprapto, Imam Sapi'ie (formerly Senen Raya), Pejambon, Medan Merdeka Timur, Veteran, and turning at HCB. For the opposite the direction, the route passes Jalan Medan Merdeka Barat, Medan Merdeka Selatan, Kwitang, Suprapto, and onwards to Pulogadung. This corridor is integrated with the Pasar Senen railway station at the Senen BRT Station, which serves the KRL Commuterline and the intercity train services and the Juanda railway station at the Juanda BRT Station, which serves the KRL Commuterline service only.

Starting March 4, 2023, corridor 2 temporarily moved its terminus to the Monumen Nasional BRT station, due to the construction of the Jakarta MRT (see #Temporary readjustment).

History

Early operational 
Corridor 2 was inaugurated on January 15, 2006, along with corridor 3. The inauguration coincides with the corridor 1 inauguration two years earlier. The inauguration received high enthusiasm from the people of Jakarta. At the same time, TransJakarta targeted that there would be 71 new bus fleets serving corridor 2 and 3 on April 2006, or three months after the first day of operational.

Route extension 
On May 19, 2014, the route was extended 7.61 kilometers from Pulo Gadung to Ujung Menteng in Bekasi. It is the first TransJakarta corridor to cross the border of the Special Capital Region of Jakarta area. The new bus stops are Raya Bekasi KIP, Raya Bekasi Tipar Cakung, Cakung United Tractors, Raya Bekasi Pasar Cakung, Raya Bekasi Cakung Cilincing, Raya Bekasi Pulo Gebang, and Raya Bekasi Ujung Menteng. At the original time of opening, 4 bus stops in Harapan Indah Estate, 2 in Estate entrance and 2 near Family Market (one for each direction) were not yet ready, however (at the end of May 2014), they were completed and the route was extended to Harapan Indah.

Further developments

BRT station revitalization 
On early 2020, as the impact of the Senen Tunnel (Underpass Senen) extention, the Senen BRT station was moved into a temporary building. After the tunnel construction completed, TransJakarta began to be rebuilt the BRT station and renovate its access bridge. The new Senen BRT station was inaugurated on November 22, 2020, with all new facilities, such as elevators on the renovated pedestrian bridge that has a design that resembles the piano keys.

On April 15, 2022, to improve service quality and to create a seamless integration with other transportation modes (such as the KRL Commuterline), and also as a follow-up of the new Senen BRT station, one of the BRT stations on Corridor 2, namely the Juanda BRT Station was temporarily closed for revitalization along with other stations on Corridor 1, 5, 9, and 11. As an alternative, a shuttle bus route that serves the route from Pecenongan–Pintu Air Juanda (2PJ) has been prepared to support waiters during the bus stop revitalization process. Other stations on Corridor 2 that were revitalized were the Kwitang on June 2022, which was already demolished on June 2021, and the Balai Kota BRT Station on 2020, due to both station building were very small and not enough to accommodate 1 series of articulated buses. Those revitalized stations were also followed by the Pulo Gadung 1 BRT station as the terminus of this corridor and its transfer station, Pulo Gadung 2 which serves corridor 4. Pulo Gadung 1 BRT station began its revitalization since September 6, 2022. The Kwitang and Balai Kota BRT Stations were reopened on August 11 and August 22, 2022 respectively, and the Juanda BRT station on March 4, 2023.

Temporary readjustment 
Harmoni Central Busway BRT station is the terminus of corridor 2 which also serving corridor 1, 3, and 8. It is the most busiest BRT station on the TransJakarta bus rapid transit system. Due to the construction of the second phase of the Jakarta MRT, the Harmoni Central BRT Station must be temporarily moved into a temporary building starting from March 4, 2023 until the MRT construction completed in 2027-2029, because the existing permament building will be demolished for the construction of the Harmoni MRT station. The temporary building doesn't have enough capacity to serve high density of passengers, so TransJakarta decided to temporarily moved this corridor's terminus to the Monumen Nasional BRT station.

List of BRT Stations 

 As the impact of the Jakarta MRT construction, Corridor 2 temporarily terminates at the Monumen Nasional BRT station starting from March 4, 2023 until the completion of the MRT construction in 2027 or 2029.
 Stations indicated by a ← sign has a one way service towards Pulo Gadung 1 only. The bus then continues to Galur. Stations indicated by a → sign has a one way service towards Monas. The bus then terminates there.
 Currently, all bus stops are served by buses 24 hours a day.
 Italic text indicates that the BRT Station is temporarily closed for revitalization or the bus do not stop at the station.

Corridor 2B (Kota Harapan Indah – ASMI) 

 *Bermis only serves corridor 2B towards Harapan Indah
 Stops of corridor 2B listed here are the high floor BRT stops, feeder stops are not included in this list.

Cross-corridor routes

Corridor 2A and 2D (Rawa Buaya–Pulo Gadung 1 and Kalideres–ASMI) 

 Apart from corridor 2A, which is operating normally, there is also an axis route (corridor 2D), which serves the ASMI–Rawa Buaya route. Corridors 2A and 2D do not stop at the Harmoni Central BRT Station.
 Stations indicated by a ← sign has a one way service towards Rawa Buaya/Kalideres only. Stations indicated by a → sign has a one way service towards Pulo Gadung 1/ASMI only.
 Italic text indicates that the BRT Station is temporarily closed for revitalization.

Corridor 2C (Monas–JIExpo Kemayoran) 

 Only operates during the Jakarta Fair.
 Stations indicated by a ← sign has a one way service towards Monas only. Stations indicated by a → sign has a one way service towards JIExpo Kemayoran only.
 Italic text indicates that the BRT Station is temporarily closed for revitalization or the bus do not stop at the station.

Fleets 

 Mercedes-Benz OH 1626 NG, white-blue (PKT)
 Scania K320IA CNG Euro VI, white-light blue (TJ + MB, special livery for Earth day, Kartini Day and Mother's day (TJ))
 Scania K310IB 6x2, white-blue (MYS)
 Hino RK1 JSNL, white-blue (TJ (only operates at Corridor 2D))
 Hino RK8 R260, blue (BMP, night bus (22:00–05:00))
 Zhongtong Bus LCK6180GC Euro 5, white-dark blue (PPD, only operates at Corridor 2D))
 Volvo B11R 6×2 A/T, white-blue (SAF)

Depots 

 Kayu Putih (TJ)
 Cawang (TJ (night bus))
 Klender (MB/MYS)
 Cakung (PPD)
 Pulogadung (PPD)
 Cijantung (MYS)
 Ciputat (BMP (night bus))
 Klender (PPD (Zhongtong Articulated bus))
 Pegangsaan Dua (PKT)
 Pegangsaan Dua (SAF)

Incidents

BRT station burning and destruction 
Two BRT stations on corridor 2, namely Senen (temporary building) and Harmoni Central was burned by demonstrators during the Omnibus law protest on October 8, 2020. The Senen (new building), Kwitang, and Gambir 1 BRT station were also damaged by the demonstrators. As the impact, Transjakarta predicting losses of all 18 BRT station burning and destructions were up to 45 billion rupiah.

See also 

 TransJakarta
 List of TransJakarta corridors

References

External links 

 

TransJakarta
Bus routes